Shahreis were the pre-Islamic rulers of Gilgit before the advent of the Muslim Trakhane. Shri Buddutt was the last of the Shahreis.

Leitner records  John Biddulph's account of the Shahreis

See also
Gilgit

Footnotes

Heads of state in Asia
History of Gilgit Agency